Metopus is a genus of anaerobic organisms from the family of Metopidae.

References

Further reading 
 
 
 
 
 
 
 

 

Intramacronucleata
Ciliate genera